Laura Allison Wasser (born May 23, 1968) is an American attorney specializing in divorce and well-known for her celebrity clients. She currently serves as Chief of Divorce Evolution for Divorce.com.

Early life and education 
Laura Allison Wasser was born in Los Angeles on May 23, 1968. Her father is prominent divorce attorney Dennis Wasser, and her mother was Bunny Wasser. Wasser graduated from Beverly Hills High School in 1986. She has a B.A. degree in Rhetoric from University of California, Berkeley, and she earned a J.D. degree from Loyola Law School in 1994. She has been a member of the California Bar since December 1994.

Career 
Laura Wasser is a divorce attorney in Los Angeles. She joined her father Dennis Wasser's family law firm Wasser Cooperman & Mandles, where she is now managing partner. Wasser was also the founder and CEO of the online divorce service It's Over Easy, which sought to allow people to handle divorces with less professional help. It's Over Easy was acquired by Divorce.com in 2022, and Wasser was brought on as Chief of Divorce Evolution for the company. Wasser hosts the podcasts "All's Fair With Laura Wasser" on iHeart Radio and "Divorce Sucks! With Laura Wasser" on PodcastOne.

Wasser has handled a number of high-profile, high-net-worth dissolutions, including those for Angelina Jolie, Heidi Klum, Kim Kardashian, Kris Jenner, Johnny Depp, Ryan Reynolds,  Christina Aguilera, Hilary Duff, Stevie Wonder, Kelis, Patricia Arquette, Kate Walsh, Johnny Knoxville, Jimmy Iovine Maria Shriver, Olivier Martinez, Kelly Clarkson, and Dr. Dre.

Alongside her father, Wasser served as an on-set legal consultant for the movie Liar Liar. She and her father also appeared in the 2014 documentary Divorce Corp. She has been called upon on TV, in print and across the media landscape in matters regarding Divorce and Family Law.

Personal life 
Wasser has two sons with two former boyfriends whom she did not marry. She divorced a different man in 1993 and she has not married again since, stating that she does not believe in lifelong monogamy or the government aspect of marriage. She resides in Los Angeles.

Awards and honors 
In June 2008, Wasser received the Harriett Buhai Center for Family Law Zephyr M. Ramsey Award  and in 2011, she was the recipient of the Century City Chamber of Commerce Women of Achievement Award. In 2013, Wasser received the Brady Center Advocate Award. In May 2019, she received the Justice Award from the Los Angeles Center for Law and Justice for her acknowledgment of the struggles faced by the self-represented and for her work in promoting civility in Family Law. Wasser has been selected to Super Lawyers every year since 2007, and has been featured on The Hollywood Reporter’s Power Lawyer Troubleshooters.

Bibliography 
 It Doesn't Have to Be That Way: How to Divorce Without Destroying Your Family or Bankrupting Yourself (St. Martin's Press, 2013) 
 What to Expect When Getting Divorced (Self-published, 2020)

See also
Lisa Helfend Meyer
Raoul Felder

References

External links 
 
 Wasser, Cooperman & Mandles website
 
 It's Over Easy website

Living people
1968 births
Lawyers from Los Angeles
UC Berkeley College of Letters and Science alumni
Loyola Law School alumni
20th-century American lawyers
21st-century American lawyers
20th-century American women lawyers
21st-century American women lawyers